Tauresium (Latin), today as Gradište, is an archaeological site in North Macedonia, approximately  southeast of the capital Skopje. Tauresium is the birthplace of Byzantine Emperor Justinian I (ca. 482) and King Theodahad of the Ostrogoths (480).

Location and general characteristics 

The site was discovered by British archaeologist Arthur Evans in the late 19th century. According to Justinian's biographer Procopius, the Emperor was born in Tauresium in 482, more precisely in the castle of Baderiana, which is near the modern village Bader.

In the book De aedificiis by Procopius he states:

The similarity in the names of Taoresium and Barderia as Taor –  and Bader –  was brought to attention by Antun Mihanović, the First Austrian Konzul 1836–1858 and proposed to the writer Hun, who stopped on his journey to investigate the location, which is noted in the book . The stories from the local peasants and badly damaged Cyrillic script were not sufficient to prove the theory initially, but later in the Monastery of St.John in Veles, Cyrillic writings were presented to him after which he concluded that this the same Byzantine City of Tauresium, birthplace of Justinian I  who laid the foundation for The First Golden Age of The Byzantine Empire.

Tauresium and the castle Baderiana were destroyed in an earthquake in 518 and the epicentre of the earthquake was in the nearby city of Skupi. As a gesture of gratitude to his birthplace, Justinian I rebuilt the city. According to the excavations that have been done so far, it is estimated that the oldest parts of Tauresium date from the 4th century and this oldest part is a castle with four towers known as Tetrapirgia. Regarding Baderiana, Procopius states that it "is a settled castle with oddments from the IV-VI century". Baderiana or the modern Bader is located 6 km east of Tauresium and Taor.

References

External links 

 tauresium.info - web page dedicated to Tauresium.

Archaeological sites in North Macedonia
Former populated places in the Balkans
Justinian I
Zelenikovo Municipality